Blee may refer to:

Chromatics 
 Color
 Colorfulness
 Hue
 Complexion

Form 
 Visual Appearance
 Shape
 Configuration (geometry)

A surname 
 Francis J. Blee (a.k.a. Francis J. "Frank" Blee), an American Republican Party politician
 Kathleen M. Blee, a professor of sociology at the University of Pittsburgh
 Robert Blee, the mayor of Cleveland, Ohio from 1893 to 1894
 Owen Blee, Dispensing Optician, Ireland

Place 
 Blee, a former village, now part of Monheim am Rhein 

Color